All the Best is a compilation album by Italian singer-songwriter Zucchero Fornaciari, released in November 2007, in celebration of the 25th anniversary of the release of his first studio album Un po' di Zucchero, released in 1983. It was promoted during Zucchero's All the Best World Tour in 2008, in its 85 concerts in Europe, Morocco, Armenia, North America, and Australia.

Overview
The compilation album was released in several editions. The regular edition was released as 2CD with 35 tracks in Italy, in Europe as 1CD with 18 tracks, while in North America and iTunes as 1CD with 15 tracks. In North America it was released on January 15, 2008 by Verve Records. The Italian edition is available in some iTunes Stores. In Italy and Europe a limited edition with 2 CD and 3 DVD (video collection, bonus videos, extras) was released too.

Depending on the edition, it includes four new covers: "Wonderful Life" by Black, which was released in Italy as single (#9), "Tutti i colori della mia vita" which is "I Won't Let You Down" by Ph.D., also released as single (#7), "Amen" which is "How Could This Go Wrong" by Exile, and "You Are So Beautiful" by Billy Preston.

The compilation, especially the Italian edition (due to its vast track list), and the European edition (because it has more hits than the American one), is the most complete compilation of his most successful songs. It includes hits "Diamante" and "Il Volo", as well as collaborations "Dune Mosse" with Miles Davis, "Miserere" with Luciano Pavarotti, the cover "Everybody's Got to Learn Sometime" (Italian version "Indaco Dagli Occhi Del Cielo") feat Vanessa Carlton and Haylie Ecker, "Ali D'Oro" feat John Lee Hooker, and "Senza Una Donna (Without A Woman)" feat Paul Young.

A 2CD limited edition All The Best + Zu & Co. was released in 2014, promoting the Night of the Proms concerts.

Reception
All About Jazz praised the American 15-tracks edition in its review, remarking that "perhaps no other recording artist in the world has recorded as many successful – and diverse – collaborations", the songs are a successful mixture of blues, soul, gospel and Italian melodies. All Jazz concluded: "never one to rest on his laurels, Zucchero continues to seek the recognition in the United States that he enjoys in the rest of the world".

Track listing

Italian Double CD
Disc 1

Disc 2

European CD

American CD

Charts and certifications

References

External links 
All the Best at Zucchero's Website
All the Best (American) at iTunes

2007 compilation albums
Zucchero Fornaciari albums
Polydor Records compilation albums